Platte County School District #2 is a public school district based in Guernsey, Wyoming, United States.

Geography
Platte County School District #2 serves northeastern Platte County as well as a very small portion of northwestern Goshen County, including the following communities:

Incorporated places
Town of Guernsey
Town of Hartville

Schools
Guernsey-Sunrise Junior/Senior High School (Grades 7–12)
Guernsey Elementary School (Grades K-6)

Student demographics
The following figures are as of October 1, 2008.

Total District Enrollment: 205
Student enrollment by gender
Male: 94 (45.85%)
Female: 111 (54.15%)
Student enrollment by ethnicity
White (not Hispanic): 172 (83.90%)
Hispanic: 28 (13.66%)
Asian or Pacific Islander: 2 (0.98%)
American Indian or Alaskan Native: 2 (0.98%)
Black (not Hispanic): 1 (0.49%)

See also
List of school districts in Wyoming

References

External links
Platte County School District #2 – official site.

Education in Platte County, Wyoming
Education in Goshen County, Wyoming
School districts in Wyoming